Lentzea guizhouensis is a lithophilous bacterium from the genus Lentzea which has been isolated from limestone from the Karst area in Guizhou, China.

References

Pseudonocardiales
Bacteria described in 2016